Gregory Stepanovych Hlady (Hryhoriy Stepanovych Hladiy;  born 4 December 1954) is a Ukrainian actor. He has appeared in more than 80 films and television shows since 1973. He starred in Music for December, which was screened in the Un Certain Regard section at the 1995 Cannes Film Festival.

Selected filmography

1974: Only Old Men Are Going to Battle - Letchik 1-y eskadrili
1980: Dudaryky
1981: Such Late, Such Warm Autumn
1982: Preodoleniye - Valentin Sergeyevich Osintsev
1984: Stolen Happiness
1985: Vozvrashchenie Batterflyay
1986: Obvinyaetsya svadba
1986: Mama, rodnaya, lyubimaya...
1987: Otstupnik - Miller
1988: Voydite, strazhdushchie! - Avenir Avdeyev
1988: Fantasticheskaya istoriya
1989: Sirano de Berzherak - Cyrano De Bergerac
1990: Leningrad. Noyabr
1990: Vospominanie bez daty
1991: Paths of Death and Angels  - Schrevek István
1991: Anna Karamazoff
1991: Slomannyy svet - Mark Yevdokimov
1991: Prosti nas, machekha-Rossiya - Guban
1992: La bête de foire - Borkine
1994: Desire in Motion (Mouvements du désir) - Homme au téléphone
1994: Mrs. Parker and the Vicious Circle - Russian Director
1994: Agnes Dei
1995: Music for December  - Aleksandr Larin
1995: Bullet to Beijing (TV Movie) - Police Captain
1996: The Ideal Man (L'homme idéal) - Lazslo
1997: Hysteria - Syd Meeker
1997: Strip Search - Helmut Wicks
1997: Les mille merveilles de l'univers - Un officer d'élite
1997: The Assignment - KGB Aide
1998: The Red Violin - Coat Attendant (Montréal)
1998: Quelque chose d'organique
1998: Musketeers Forever - Lead Russian Mobster
1999: Running Home - Truba
1999: Laura Cadieux II (Laura Cadieux... la suite)
2000: The Undefeated - Roman Shukhevych
2002: The Sum of All Fears - Milinov
2002: The Marsh (Le Marais) - Alexandre
2003: Far Side of the Moon - L'interpréte
2003: Spinning Boris - Andrei Lugov
2004: Jack Paradise: Montreal by Night (Jack Paradise : Les nuits de Montréal) - Gino O'Connor
2004: Manners of Dying - The Cook
2005: The Iris Effect - Ivan
2006: Deliver Me (Délivrez-moi) - Milan
2006: The Ugly Swans - Viktor Banev
2006: The Point - Grey Car Guy
2006: Pourquoi le dire?
2008: Akme
2010: L'appât - Poutine
2011: Noch na zakate leta - Pater Lukas
2013: Diego Star - Kopeïkine
2013: Jappeloup - Speaker concours
2014: X-Men: Days of Future Past - General Petrov
2015: The Forbidden Room - Jarvis / Dr. Deane / A Husband
2015: Occupation (TV Series)
2015: The Name You Carry
2016: Seances
2017: Zradnyk - Osavul
2017: Gear - Roman

Theater

Actor
 Eugène Onéguine Jonas Vaitkus / Dramatic russian art theatre of Lituanie / (2013 to 2014)	
 Un tramway nommé Désir Alexandre Marine / Th. du Rideau Vert / (2009) 
 Mozart et Salieri Anatoly Vassiliev / Tour : Amsterdam and Avignon / (2006) 
 L'Autre Paula De Vasconcellos / Pigeons International / Usine C / Tour: Portugal, Germany, Vancouver / (2001 to 2002)

Director
 The Gambler  Fyodor Dostoyevsky/ Prospero, Montréal, Canada (2016)
 The Dance of Death  August Strindberg/ Prospero Montréal, Canada (2012)
 The Wedding Bertolt Brecht / Prospero	Montréal, Canada (2011)
 Heart of a Dog Mikhail Bulgakov / Prospero Montréal, Canada (2008)
 Le Roi se Meurt Ionesko / La Veillée Montréal, Canada (1994)
 Le Retour Harold Pinter / La Veillée Montréal, Canada (1992)
 Amerika Franz Kafka / La Veillée Montréal, Canada (1992)

References

External links

1954 births
Living people
People from Ternopil Oblast
Soviet male film actors
Ukrainian male television actors
Ukrainian male film actors
Ukrainian emigrants to Canada
Kyiv National I. K. Karpenko-Kary Theatre, Cinema and Television University alumni
Russian Academy of Theatre Arts alumni